Archery is one of the optional sports at the quadrennial Commonwealth Games competition. It has been a Commonwealth Games sport since 1982, but has only featured twice in the competition's history, at the 1982 Commonwealth Games and at the 2010 Commonwealth Games. It is an optional sport and may or may not be included in the sporting programme of each edition of the Games. The host country of the games decides whether to include it.

Editions

All-time medal table

External links
Commonwealth Games sport index

 
Sports at the Commonwealth Games
Commonwealth Games